The 1948 United States presidential election in Pennsylvania took place on November 2, 1948 as part of the 1948 United States presidential election. Voters chose 35 representatives, or electors to the Electoral College, who voted for president and vice president.

Pennsylvania voted for the Republican nominee, New York Governor Thomas E. Dewey, over the Democratic nominee, President Harry Truman. Dewey won Pennsylvania by a margin of 4.01%. , this is the last time that a Democrat won the national election without carrying Pennsylvania, although in 2016, Democrats won the national popular vote without the state.

This is the last time any candidate won Pennsylvania without carrying Northampton County, and the last time a Republican won Pennsylvania without carrying neighboring Ohio.

Results

Results by county

See also
 List of United States presidential elections in Pennsylvania

References

Pennsylvania
1948
1948 Pennsylvania elections